The American League President was the chief executive of the American League of professional baseball until 1999, when the AL and National League merged into Major League Baseball.

American League Presidents

Honorary president
Following the 1999 season, the American and National Leagues were merged with Major League Baseball, and the leagues ceased to exist as business entities. The role of the league president was eliminated. Jackie Autry, the widow of former Angels owner Gene Autry served as honorary president of the AL, from 2000 to 2015. Hall of Famer Frank Robinson held the title from 2015 until his death in 2019.

See also
List of National League presidents

American League presidents
American League presidents
presidents